The Aktogay mine (Aqtoǵaı mys ken orny) is a large open-pit mine located in south eastern Kazakhstan in East Kazakhstan Province approximately 250 km from Kazakhstan - China border. Aktogay is KAZ Minerals's second major growth project.

The Aktogay ore body consists of an oxide deposit on top of a larger sulphide deposit, the latter containing some valuable molybdenum as a by-product. The project will include an open-pit mine and concentrator and has a production life of over 50 years.

General 

The Aktogay project has a measured and indicated oxide ore resource of 121 MT with a copper grade of 0.37%, and a sulphide ore resource of 1,597 MT at a copper grade of 0.33%. The project will initially develop the deposit’s oxide resource which is located above the sulphide ore body at the SX/WE plant currently under construction. The sulphide resource extracted from the Aktogay mine will be processed at the concentrator on site, currently under construction.
Aktogay will employ around 3,000 people at peak construction activity and around 1,500 people when operational. First oxide copper cathode production is expected in the fourth quarter of 2015, whilst first sulphide copper in concentrate output is planned for 2017.

See also
 KAZ Minerals
 Bozshakhol
 Koksay
 Bozymchak

References

External links 
 : www.kazminerals.com
 Aktogay Project page

Copper mines in Kazakhstan